Ironopolia sobriella is a moth of the family Oecophoridae. It is found in Australia, where it has been recorded from Queensland, New South Wales, the Australian Capital Territory, Victoria, South Australia and Western Australia. The species was described by Francis Walker in 1863.

The wingspan is about 20 mm. The forewings are pale brown with dark spots. The hindwings are plain brown.

The larvae feed on Eucalyptus species, living and feeding in a shelter consisting of two dead leaves of the host plant joined with silk and frass. Pupation takes place in a case, made by cutting an oval section out of the larval shelter.

References

Moths described in 1863
Ironopolia